Thalassobacillus devorans is a Gram-positive, oxidase positive, catalase negative, rod shaped moderately halophilic and phenol-degrading bacterium from the genus of Thalassobacillus which has been isolated from saline sals from Spain. Single colonies are small (pin headed) in size. S.I. Paul et al. (2021) isolated and biochemically characterized Thalassobacillus devorans (strains WS8, WS24, WS31) from marine sponge (Haliclona rosea) of the Saint Martin's Island of the Bay of Bengal, Bangladesh. They can hydrolyze gelatin, Tween 40, 60 and 80. They can produce acid from Glycerol, Galactose, D-Glucose, D-Fructose, D-Mannose, Mannitol, N-Acetylglucosamine, Amygdalin, Maltose, D-Melibiose, D-Trehalose, Glycogen, D-Turanose.

References

External links
Type strain of Thalassobacillus devorans at BacDive -  the Bacterial Diversity Metadatabase
 

Bacillaceae
Bacteria described in 2005